Lorenzo Benedetti (born 24 June 1992) is an Italian footballer. He plays for Seravezza Pozzi.

Biography
Benedetti started his career at ACF Fiorentina. He was the member of its U17 team in 2008–09 season. In 2009, instead of promoted to the reserve, Benedetti was allowed to leave for amateur team Ponsacco. Benedetti left for another Serie D team Camaiore in 2010–11 Serie D. In summer 2011 he was signed by his fourth Tuscan team A.C. Prato, where he played his first fully professional season in 2011–12 Lega Pro Prima Divisione. He was selected to the representative team of Lega Pro in December 2011, against Italy U19. He also capped for the same team against England C and San Marino U21. He also won a youth cup in Dubai.

In January 2013 he was sold to Viareggio in a co-ownership deal. In June 2014 Prato bought back Benedetti. On 1 September 2014 he was signed by Lucchese in a temporary deal. On 16 December 2015 Benedetti was released by Prato.

Following that, he played the next 3.5 seasons in Serie D and Eccellenza, eventually earning promotion to Serie C for 2019–20 season with Pianese after scoring 23 goals in Serie D in 2018–19. He was released from his contract with Pianese on 12 December 2019, after coming to agreement with Serie D club Follonica Gavorrano five days prior. In the summer 2020, Benedetti moved to Union Feltre. A year later, he moved to Seravezza Pozzi.

References

External links
 Football.it Profile 
 

1992 births
People from Pietrasanta
Sportspeople from the Province of Lucca
Living people
Italian footballers
Association football forwards
ACF Fiorentina players
A.C. Prato players
A.S.D. Olimpia Colligiana players
S.S.D. Lucchese 1905 players
U.S. Pianese players
U.S. Gavorrano players
Serie C players
Serie D players
Footballers from Tuscany